This is a list of ecoregions in Israel.

Terrestrial
Israel is in the Palearctic realm. Ecoregions are listed by biome.

Temperate grasslands, savannas, and shrublands
 Middle East steppe

Mediterranean forests, woodlands, and scrub
 Eastern Mediterranean conifer-broadleaf forests
 Southern Anatolian montane conifer and deciduous forests

Deserts and xeric shrublands
 Arabian desert
 Mesopotamian shrub desert
 Red Sea Nubo-Sindian tropical desert and semi-desert

Freshwater
 Coastal Levant
 Jordan River
 Sinai

Marine
 Levantine Sea, part of the Mediterranean Sea marine province in the Temperate Northern Atlantic marine realm
 Northern and Central Red Sea, part of the Red Sea and Gulf of Aden marine province in the Western Indo-Pacific marine realm.

Israel
ecoregions
 *